Tuchomie  is a village in Bytów County, Pomeranian Voivodeship, in northern Poland. It is the seat of the gmina (administrative district) called Gmina Tuchomie.

The village has a population of 1,365.

References

Tuchomie

it:Tuchomie